The 1985 Troy State Trojans football team represented Troy State University (now known as Troy University) as a member of the Gulf South Conference (GSC) during the 1985 NCAA Division II football season. Led by first-year head coach Rick Rhoades, the Trojans compiled an overall record of 6–4, with a mark of 6–2 in conference play, and finished third in the GSC.

Schedule

References

Troy State
Troy Trojans football seasons
Troy State Trojans football